Monkali is a village in Homalin Township, Hkamti District, in the Sagaing Region of northwestern Burma. It lies on the banks of the Chindwin River, south of Homalin town.

References

External links
Maplandia World Gazetteer

Populated places in Hkamti District
Homalin Township